Entephria multivagata is a species of geometrid moth in the family Geometridae. It is found in North America.

The MONA or Hodges number for Entephria multivagata is 7301.

References

Further reading

External links

 

Hydriomenini
Articles created by Qbugbot
Moths described in 1881